Lodash is a JavaScript library which provides utility functions for common programming tasks using the functional programming paradigm.

History 
See also Underscore § History.

Lodash is a fork of Underscore.js.

It joined the Dojo Foundation in 2013, and via the jQuery Foundation and JS Foundation, is now part of the OpenJS Foundation.

Summary 
Lodash is a JavaScript library that helps programmers write more concise and maintainable JavaScript.

It can be broken down into several main areas:

 Utilities: for simplifying common programming tasks such as determining type as well as simplifying math operations.
 Function: simplifying binding, decorating, constraining, throttling, debouncing, currying, and changing the pointer.
 String: conversion functions for performing basic string operations, such as trimming, converting to uppercase, camel case, etc.
 Array: creating, splitting, combining, modifying, and compressing
 Collection: iterating, sorting, filtering, splitting, and  building
 Object: accessing, extending, merging, defaults, and transforming
 Seq: chaining, wrapping, filtering, and testing.

It has had multiple releases, so not all functions are available in all implementations.  For example, _.chunk has only been available since version 3.0.0.

See also

 Underscore.js
 Prototype.js

References

External links

Documentation

JavaScript libraries